Position Tolerance (symbol: ⌖) is a geometric dimensioning and tolerancing (GD&T) location control used on engineering drawings to specify desired location, as well as allowed deviation to the position of a feature on a part. 

Position tolerance must only be applied to features of size, which requires that the feature have at least two opposable points.

See also
 Circle
 Miscellaneous Technical

Technical drawing